Baraeus tridentatus is a species of beetle in the family Cerambycidae. It was described by Johan Christian Fabricius in 1801. It is known from Nigeria, the Ivory Coast, the Democratic Republic of the Congo, Cameroon, and Togo.

References

Pteropliini
Beetles described in 1801